The Cadillac Series 65, after the Series 60, represented Cadillac's second, and, being built on the C-body instead of the B-body, somewhat physically larger entry into the mid-priced vehicle market when it appeared in 1937. It was slightly higher in status than the LaSalle, also offered by Cadillac.

Overview 
In 1937 it was offered in only one body style, a 4-door 5-seat sedan, built by Fisher on the same   wheelbase as used by the Cadillac Series 70 and the Buick Roadmaster.  The car offered a longer heavier car than the Series 60 at a price below that of the Fleetwood bodied Series 70.

Under the hood was the Monobloc V8. This engine produced 135 hp (101 kW) at 3400 R.P.M. The car had Bendix dual-servo brakes, "Knee-Action" independent suspension in front and a Stromberg carburetor ('37: AA-25; '38: AAV-25) with an electric choke.

In 1938 the Series 65 and the Series 75 shared a new front end style featuring a massive vertical cellular grille, three sets of horizontal bars on the hood sides, alligator hood, and headlights on the filler space between the fenders and the hood. Optional sidemount covers were hinged to the fenders. Quarter windows were of sliding rather than hinged construction. The rear of the body had rounder corners and more smoothly blended lines. Trunks had more of an appearance of being an integral part of the body. Bodies were all steel except for wooden main sills. New chassis details included a column gear shift, horns just behind the grille, battery under the right hand side of the hood, transverse muffler just behind the fuel tank, wheels by a different manufacturer, "Synchro-Flex" flywheel, hypoid rear axle and the deletion of the oil filter.

References 

65
Motor vehicles manufactured in the United States
Rear-wheel-drive vehicles
Full-size vehicles
Luxury vehicles
Sedans
Convertibles
Cars introduced in 1937